The 2000 Asia Cup (as called Pepsi Asia Cup) was the seventh edition of the Asia Cup for cricket, which was held in Bangladesh between 29 May – 7 June 2000. India, Pakistan, Sri Lanka, and Bangladesh took part in the tournament. Pakistan won their first ever Asia cup beating Sri Lanka by 39 runs in the final. All the games were played at Dhaka's Bangabandhu National Stadium. Yousuf Youhana was declared the Man of the Series.

Tournament structure 

Each side played each other once in the group stages. The top 2 teams based on points at the end of the group stages met each other in a one-off final. Each win yielded 2 points while a tie/no result yielded 1 point.

Venue
7 matches were played at Bangabandhu National Stadium, Dhaka.

Squads

Group stage table

Match summary

Final

Statistics

Most runs

Most wickets

References

External links

2000 in Bangladeshi cricket
2000
International cricket competitions from 1997–98 to 2000
International cricket competitions in Bangladesh
May 2000 sports events in Asia
June 2000 sports events in Asia